The Riot Squad is a supervillain team appearing in American comic books published by Marvel Comics. They are often depicted as enemies of Hulk.

Publication history
The Riot Squad first appeared in The Incredible Hulk (vol. 2) #345 and was created by Peter David, Todd McFarlane, and Jeff Purves.

Fictional team history
When Leader detonated a gamma bomb in Middletown, Arizona, only a few of its population near 5,000 survived where they were all mutated into gamma monsters. Some of the survivors consisting of Hotshot, Jailbait, Ogress, Omnibus, and Soul Man came together with Rock and Redeemer to form the Riot Squad. They became the protectors of Leader's base Freehold and protected it at the time when Leader had a terminal illness. They first clashed with Hulk when Leader would provide him the information on where Betty Ross is in exchange that Hulk kills Madman.

The Riot Squad later worked with the U-Foes to distract Hulk and the Pantheon at the time when Leader was meeting with Agamemnon Hulk and the Pantheon's fight with the U-Foes and the Riot Squad are broken up when Agamemnon reaches an agreement with Leader.

The Riot Squad later fought the forces of HYDRA when they invade Leader's base. They did not fare well against them and the battle resulted in the death of Soul Man (who was in the middle of resurrecting Marlo Chandler). With the Leader also seemingly dead, his position was taken over by Omnibus. Not being content with the Freeholders' peaceful existence and apparently possessed by the Leader's surviving consciousness and mind control powers, Omnibus manipulated Major Matt Talbot and others in the U.S. government in his own power-seeking plans. Omnibus' compatriots learned that he was responsible for the worldwide bombings in the name of the fictitious terrorists of the "Alliance."

The Riot Squad worked with the Avengers to shut down Omnibus' remaining bombs. The rest of Riot Squad judged Omnibus guilty and sentenced him to death. The members of Riot Squad left Omnibus in the arctic to die where he was attacked by a polar bear.

The loss of Omnibus allowed the Troyjans to invade the Riot Squad's base.

Hotshot resurfaces where it is revealed that Jailbait is dead after losing control of her powers and has starting to lose his minds. He held a church hostage to get a priest to read the last rites for Jailbait. Hulk broke in to the church and defeated Hotshot who was arrested by the police. Still losing his mind over Jailbait's death, Hotshot hanged himself in his jail cell. It was later revealed that Jailbait lost control of her powers because she was possessed by the One Below All posing as Brian Banner's ghost.

Members
 Rock –  Samuel LaRoquette was an African-American born to a low-income inner city family. This fueled his desire to see the natural world, where he grew into an explorer who survived all Earth's ecosystems, then gained an academic career with that acclaim. However, he became sexually involved with a student and angrily punched the university dean when confronted about this. He then got a job with Argo Industries, but his headstrong attitude during a petroleum expedition overruled recommendations to retreat, where an earthquake killed two of his men. LaRoquette finally joined Hulkbusters along with Craig Saunders, but both men struggled with amnesia after Nick Fury shut down the unit, where they eventually fell in with Samuel Sterns. Leader coated his body with pliable stone, giving his body a near-indestructible exoskeleton. His name "Rock" referred to his earlier love of nature, as well as the opposite of his unchecked prior temper.
 Redeemer – Craig Saunders Jr. was recruited by S.H.I.E.L.D as an advisor alongside Sam LaRoquette where they were manipulated by the enhanced Leader into becoming his brainwashed pawn. He originally was a US Army officer specializing in explosive ordnance disposal. Per chance at an airport terminal he detected a terrorist bomb hidden in an unattended briefcase and kicked it into a ladies' room, failing to realize a young woman and her infant daughter were inside when it detonated. The resulting bad publicity ruined Saunders' military career, and he hoped to atone for his mistake by joining the Hulkbusters, hence his name "Redeemer".
 Hotshot – Louis Lembert is a high school athlete and the boyfriend of Jessie Harrison who was mutated by the gamma bomb where he sported green skin and yellow hair. He can project energy bolts from his hands. When his girlfriend's powers got out of control, Hotshot had no choice but to kill her to save his fellow Riot Squad members. He was later taken into police custody, but committed suicide in his jail cell out of grief for killing Jailbait.
 Jailbait – Jessica Harrison is the girlfriend of Louis Lembert who was mutated by the gamma bomb where she sported green skin and an increased bust size, and outfitted herself in a leotard. Before the gamma bomb detonated she was a teenager in an unauthorized relationship with the slightly older Louis Lembert, and had planned to elope with Lembert to flee her parents (who were immediately killed in the blast). She can create energy cages around what she sees, but her powers eventually got so out of control she proved a threat to friend and foe alike, and was killed by her paramour Hotshot.
 Ogress – Diana Davids is a lawyer who was mutated by the gamma bomb where it gave her green skin, a large muscular physique, and excessive body hair. She possesses superhuman strength and invulnerability.
 Omnibus – Burt Horowitz is a traveling encyclopedia salesman who was mutated by the gamma bomb where he gained green skin and a tall head. He possesses superhuman intelligence, and 'any super-power he already believes he has'.
 Soul Man – Jason McCall is a priest who was mutated by the gamma bomb where he gained green skin, but in later editions he reverted to his original skin color. Before the gamma bomb went off, Jason was due to stand trial for embezzlement of tithing funds of the church he ministered. His transformation made him a near-omnipotent being who can recall people from death, but he must keep his concentration to do so.

References

External links
 Riot Squad at Marvel Wiki
 Riot Squad at Comic Vine

Characters created by Peter David
Characters created by Todd McFarlane 
Marvel Comics supervillain teams
Fictional organizations